James Coyne could refer to:

James Henry Coyne (1849–1942), Canadian lawyer and historian
James Bowes Coyne, Canadian lawyer and jurist, son of Henry
James Elliott Coyne (1910–2012), Canadian Governor of the Bank of Canada, son of Bowes
James K. Coyne III (born 1946), U.S. Representative from Pennsylvania
James C. Coyne (born 1947), American psychologist

See also
Jamie Coyne